Liaozhong District is one of ten districts of the prefecture-level city of Shenyang, the capital of Liaoning Province, Northeast China. The name of the district literally means "Central Liao[ning]", referring to its central location within the province. It is the southernmost county-level division of Shenyang City, bordering Xinmin City to the north, and Tiexi District to the northeast, as well as the prefecture-level cities of Liaoyang to the southeast, Anshan to the south and southwest, and Jinzhou to the west.

Administrative divisions
There are 14 towns, and three townships within the district.

Towns:

Townships:
Laodafang Township*Daheigangzi Township*Niuxintuo Township

Climate

References

External links

County-level divisions of Liaoning